Adnan Jashari (born November 29, 1965). Minister of Justice, Associate Professor in Law, member of the Democratic Union for Integration (DUI), the party of the Albanian ethnic community in Macedonia.

Studies and academic career  
Jan 1997 – July 2002 he studied at University of Prishtina, doctor of juridical sciences, Ph.D. in Law, Thesis: "Foreign direct investment in developing countries with a unique look at Macedonia"
2003 – 2011 he was professor at South East European University (SEEU), Tetovо, Business Law, Fiscal Law and International Economic Law
2004-2008 he was vice-president of the Board for Accreditation of  Higher Education in the Republic of Macedonia during, where he participated in the accreditation process for many universities and colleges in the country.
2007 – 2009 he taught as professor at the private University FAMA, Kosova, Prishtine, From 2011 he was professor for business law at SEEU, Tetova and other universities. He was also a consultant in a number of legislative committees in drafting laws in the area of business law in the Republic of. Macedonia and in the Republic of Kosovo..

Political career 
1997-2003 Jashari worked as Inspector of the Public Revenue Service in Gostivar. 2002-2005 Secretary of DUI in Gostivar and member of the board of that party. 
2003–2009 (according other sources 2002-2006 and 2006-2010) he was member of Parliament of Macedonia, member of the Legislative Committee, Committee on Agriculture, Forestry and Water Resources Management, Committee on Education, Science and Sport, member of the Parliamentary Group of the Assembly of the Republic of Macedonia for Cooperation with the Parliament of the Republic of Ukraine, and Australia, chairman of the Group with the Parliament of Netherlands.

Some of the laws that have been passed in the Parliament of the Republic of Macedonia, are: Law on Trade Companies in the Republic of Macedonia, Bankruptcy Law in the Republic of Macedonia, Law on Higher Education in the Republic of Macedonia, Law on Intellectual Property in the Republic of Macedonia, and other laws.

In June 2014 Adnan Jashari was appointed Minister of Justice in the Government of Premier Nikola Gruevski. He replaced Blerim Bexheti, also a politician of DUI.

Publications 
 A. Jashari, Commercial Law, published vy SEEU, Tetovo, 2012.
 A.Jashari. Subject of business law. Tetovo, 2009. . 
 A.Jashari. Pignus according to Albanian customary law. In Jehona, pp. 12. 2009. ISSN 1857-6354. 
 I.Zejneli,J.Shasivari,A.Aliu,A.Bilalli, A.Jashari. Dictionary Albanian –Macedonian and vice versa. Published by SEEU, 2008. . 
 A.Jashari. FDI-Foreign Direct Investment in transitional countries. Published by SEEU, 2007. .

Professor Jashari also wrote articles about Intellectual property rights, the property regime of spouses in German law, responsibility for medical errors, economic competition, transformation of trade companies, responsibility for environment damage, technology transfer and customer protection.

References

External links
 Biography on the page of the Macedonian Government (only in Macedonian).
 Biography and Picture of Adnan Jashari on the page of the Ministry of Justice
 South East European University, Tetova, Profile of Adnan Jashari.
 Adnan Jashari, former member of Macedonian Parliament 
 Some short remarks on Adnan Jashari, photo
 Democratic Union of Integration, Profile of Adnan Jashari (only in Albanian), the biography is different from his biographies in other sources  
 Adnan Jashari Tubimi parazgjedhor Gostivar 2014 – Adnan Jashari election campaign in Gostivar on 23 April 2014 (in Albanian)

Living people
People from Gostivar Municipality
Macedonian lawyers
Macedonian politicians
Government ministers of North Macedonia
1965 births
University of Pristina alumni